Peter Edvin Lindgren (13 December 1915 – 30 May 1981) was a Swedish actor. His many roles include the part of Lena's father in I Am Curious (Yellow) (1967) and I Am Curious (Blue) (1968). He won the award for best actor at the 16th Guldbagge Awards for his role in I Am Maria.

He was the father of actress Monica Nielsen.

Selected filmography

 Med folket för fosterlandet (1938) - Striker (uncredited)
 Du gamla du fria! (1938) - Lundström (uncredited)
 Frun tillhanda (1939) - Young Man (uncredited)
 With Open Arms (1940) - Student (uncredited)
 Snapphanar (1941) - Guerilla soldier (uncredited)
 Meeting in the Night (1946) - Filarn
 Evening at the Djurgarden (1946) - Nicke
 Iris and the Lieutenant (1946) - Svante (engineer)
 A Ship Bound for India (1947) - Foreign sailor (uncredited)
 Det kom en gäst... (1947) - Pastorn
 Bill Bergson, Master Detective (1947) - Tjommen
 The People of Simlang Valley (1947) - Tattar-Jan
 Hammarforsens brus (1948) - Anders
 The Street (1949) - Bertil 'Berra' Wiring
 Big Lasse of Delsbo (1949) - Klas Hägglund
 The Realm of the Rye (1950) - Markus
 To mistenkelige personer (1950) - Ekstrøm
 Stronger Than the Law (1951) - Manuel
 Encounter with Life (1952) - Gun's Friend
 Flottare med färg (1952) - Ivar Persson
 Ursula - Flickan i Finnskogarna (1953) - Arne
 Barabbas (1953) - Soldier which Assaulted Gang (uncredited)
 Our Father and the Gypsy (1954) - Mickel
 The Vicious Breed (1954) - Inmate
 Voyage in the Night (1955) - Berra
 Savnet siden mandag (1955)
 The Summer Wind Blows (1955) - Gustav-Adolf Hållman
 Mord, lilla vän (1955) - Valter Smitt
 Night Child (1956) - Bruno (uncredited)
 Swing it, fröken (1956) - Bi
 A Dreamer's Journey (1957) - Anders Kolare
 Blondin i fara (1957) - Night Club Customer
 Never in Your Life (1957) - Ärtan
 Do You Believe in Angels? (1961) - Poker player (uncredited)
 Hide and Seek (1963) - Intellektuelle Johansson (uncredited)
 Träfracken (1966) - Grevén
 I Am Curious (Yellow) (1967) - Rune Nyman
 I Am Curious (Blue) (1968) - Lena's Father
 Vindingevals (1968) - Söder
 We Are All Demons (1969) - First Mate
 The New Land (1972) - Samuel Nöjd
 Maria Marusjka (1973) - Ewert, fyrvokter
 Ebon Lundin (1973) - Fyllo
 Gangsterfilmen (1974) - Hans Nilsson
 Lejonet och jungfrun (1975) - Blomberg
 Garaget (1975) - Adolphson
 City of My Dreams (1976) - Storsäcken
 Drömmen om Amerika (1976) - Per-Olov
 Kejsaren (1979) - Sjökapten
 Linus eller Tegelhusets hemlighet (1979) - Medlem av stråkkvartett
 Lucie (1979) - Rapist
 I Am Maria (1979) - Jon
 Blomstrande tider (1980) - Joel
 Lyckliga vi... (1980) - The Old Swedish Man
 Sverige åt svenskarna (1980) - Swedish soldier
 Arme, syndige menneske (1980) - Swedish sailor

References

External links

1915 births
1981 deaths
People from Lidingö Municipality
Best Actor Guldbagge Award winners
20th-century Swedish male actors